Kaj de Rooij (born 25 November 2000) is a Dutch professional footballer who plays as a forward for NAC Breda.

Club career
He made his Eerste Divisie debut for FC Eindhoven on 17 August 2018 in a game against Jong PSV, as an 85th-minute substitute for Alessio Carlone.

On 4 October 2020, he signed a three-year contract with NAC Breda.

References

External links
 

2000 births
Living people
Dutch footballers
Association football forwards
FC Eindhoven players
NAC Breda players
Eerste Divisie players
People from Best, Netherlands
Footballers from North Brabant